The National Museum of Natural History is a museum that covers the natural heritage of Sri Lanka. The museum is located closer to the National Museum of Colombo. It was established on September 23, 1986 and became only one museum in Sri Lanka that represents natural history and natural heritage.

The National Museum of Natural History exhibits rare and threatened with extinction such as natural heritage of plant and animal species endemic to Sri Lanka, over 5,000 specimens of mammals, jurassic period indigenous fossils and various kinds of geological rocks.

Opening hours 
The museum opens from 8.30 AM to 5.00 PM and closes on public holidays.

See also 
 List of museums in Sri Lanka

References 

Museums in Colombo
Sri Lanka
Natural history museums
History museums in Sri Lanka